Ryan William Mullen (born 7 August 1994) is an Irish professional racing cyclist, who currently rides for UCI WorldTeam .

Career
Born in Birkenhead, England, Mullen attended Ysgol Eirias in Colwyn Bay, Wales. While he was attending Ysgol Eirias, Mullen was a member of Rhos on Sea Cycling Club, the same club as  general manager and former head of British Cycling Dave Brailsford. In February 2014, Mullen finished 4th in the Elite Men's Individual Pursuit at the UCI track world championships in Cali, Colombia. At the 2014 Irish National championships in Multyfarnham, Westmeath, Mullen became the youngest ever Irish Elite Road Race champion. On the same weekend he also won the U23 Individual Time Trial and Road Race titles.

He took the silver in the under-23 time trial at the 2014 UCI Road World Championships in Ponferrada, finishing half a second behind winner Campbell Flakemore of Australia. He rode at the 2015 UCI Track Cycling World Championships, where he came seventh in the individual pursuit. Mullen won the Irish national time trial championship in 2015, becoming the youngest ever rider to take the title. He was at a disadvantage because he did his ride in wet conditions and finished eleventh, 49 seconds behind the winner, Mads Würtz Schmidt.

Trek–Segafredo (2018–2021)
In September 2017 it was confirmed that he would join  for the 2018 season. Mullen's first race for the team was the Vuelta a San Juan, he went on to win the Time-Trial on stage 3. In an interview with Cyclingnews.com Mullen confirmed he was likely to make his Grand Tour debut at the Giro d'Italia, where he was targeting the Time-Trial on stage 1 in Jerusalem. He did make his Grand Tour début in the race, finishing 138th overall.

Bora–Hansgrohe

Major results

2010
 3rd Time trial, British National Junior Road Championships
2011
 Irish National Junior Road Championships
1st  Time trial
1st  Road race
2012
 1st  Time trial, Irish National Junior Road Championships
 1st Chrono des Nations Juniors
 2nd  Time trial, UEC European Junior Road Championships
 6th Overall Niedersachsen Rundfahrt Juniors
 9th Time trial, UCI Junior Road World Championships
2013
 1st  Time trial, Irish National Under-23 Road Championships
 1st Chrono des Nations U23
 UEC European Under-23 Track Championships
3rd  Individual pursuit
3rd  Scratch
 7th Time trial, UCI Under-23 Road World Championships
2014
 Irish National Road Championships
1st  Road race
1st  Under-23 road race
1st  Under-23 time trial
 2nd  Time trial, UCI Under-23 Road World Championships
 6th ZLM Tour
2015
 Irish National Road Championships
1st  Time trial
1st  Under-23 time trial
 3rd Overall An Post Rás
1st  Young rider classification
 4th Time trial, UEC European Under-23 Road Championships
 8th Time trial, European Games
2016
 1st Stage 1 (TTT) Czech Cycling Tour
 Irish National Road Championships
2nd Under-23 time trial
3rd Time trial
9th Road race
 4th Chrono des Nations
 5th Time trial, UCI Road World Championships
2017
 Irish National Road Championships
1st  Road race
1st  Time trial
 3rd  Time trial, UEC European Road Championships
 8th Chrono des Nations
 10th Overall Tour of Britain
2018
 1st  Time trial, National Road Championships
 1st Stage 3 (ITT) Vuelta a San Juan
 6th Time trial, UEC European Road Championships
2019
 Irish National Road Championships
1st  Time trial
3rd Road race
 4th Time trial, European Games
2020
 8th Time trial, UEC European Road Championships
2021
 Irish National Road Championships
1st  Road race
1st  Time trial
2022
 10th Scheldeprijs
 10th Rund um Köln

Grand Tour general classification results timeline

References

External links

1994 births
Living people
Irish male cyclists
Sportspeople from Birkenhead
European Games competitors for Ireland
Cyclists at the 2015 European Games
Cyclists at the 2019 European Games